Antequera is a genus of moth in the family Cosmopterigidae.

Species
Antequera acertella (Busck, 1913)
Antequera exstimulata

References
Natural History Museum Lepidoptera genus database

Antequerinae
Moth genera